Mikhail Rybak (born 26 August 1963) is a Belarusian equestrian. He competed in two events at the 1992 Summer Olympics.

References

External links
 

1963 births
Living people
Belarusian male equestrians
Olympic equestrians of the Unified Team
Equestrians at the 1992 Summer Olympics
Sportspeople from Minsk